The discography of Ida Corr, a Danish soul and pop singer and songwriter, consists of three studio albums, one international compilation album, ten singles as a lead artist, and a number of collaborations with other artists. In 2002 she released a self-titled album with the girl group Sha Li Mar, who rose to fame in the TV2 show Venner for livet (literally "Friends Forever"). As a member of the group SugaRush Beat Company Ida Corr has released one studio album and several singles since 2005.

Albums

Studio albums

Compilation albums

Albums with groups

Singles

As lead artist

As featured artist

As part of a group

Music videos

See also 
 SugaRush Beat Company

References 
	

Discographies of Danish artists